W. Lunsford Crew (October 29, 1917 – October 10, 2004) was an American politician who served in the North Carolina Senate from the 4th district from 1953 to 1965.

He died on October 10, 2004, in Kitty Hawk, North Carolina at age 86.

References

1917 births
2004 deaths
Democratic Party North Carolina state senators
20th-century American politicians